The Centre Area Transportation Authority (CATA) is a mass transit agency that provides bus transportation within State College, Pennsylvania and the surrounding areas, as well as Pennsylvania State University.

History 

The company first started as Centre Area Transit (CAT), which was formed to provide a vehicle to subsidize public transit throughout the region. Then on May 17, 1974, the Centre Area Transportation Authority (CATA) was incorporated. By the end of its first year, CATA was officially up and running and its annual ridership was 201,000. By 1979, ridership was continuing to grow year after year prompting CATA to add more bus routes as well as additional buses built by General Motors Corporation. It was then in 1990 that ridership had officially hit the two million mark. Currently all of CATA's fleet buses are CNG-powered and ridership has exceeded seven million passengers, the majority of riders being Penn State students.

Clean Natural Gas Program 
In 1993, the CATA Board of Directions made a decision, to start running its buses using Compressed natural gas. With this decision, CATA started the Clean Natural Gas Program, along with Columbia Gas of Pennsylvania, where the buses uses clean-burning compressed natural gas that improves the environment. The fuel conversion became easy, as CATA operates its routes close to where natural gas is produced. By then, a natural gas fueling station was installed in the facility in 1995, where CATA can store all natural gas buses in their facility. In 1996, CATA introduced their first fleet of natural gas buses built by Orion Bus Industries. Following delivery, CATA began working with local officials to install natural gas fueling station, to provide natural gas as a fueling option for the public. From 1997 to 2002, CATA began to expand its facility, by adding more natural gas buses with the new state-of-the-art New Flyer low-floor buses, and more fueling dispenser, to expand its capacity, and more fueling capacity. Then, a canopy was installed above the station in the facility, where CATA will be able to fuel buses out of the snow. Following the entire program, CATA would eventually phase out the remaining GMC diesel-powered buses. The Clean Natural Gas program was completed in 2005, making the first agency in the east coast to have its facility converted to hold natural gas buses.

Hydrogen bus project 
Following the completion of the Clean Natural Gas program, CATA continued to experiment more alternate fueling option, by joining with Penn State and Larson Transportation Institute. In 2006, the CATA board began to research to have the fleet to run on Hydrogen fuel cell. With the research, one of CATA's buses (Bus #85) was converted to a hydrogen-powered bus, to be a part of an extensive hydrogen demonstration project that is being conducted by Penn State's Pennsylvania Transportation Institute (PTI). Air Products & Chemicals of Allentown, Pennsylvania and Collier Technologies of Reno, Nevada in 2007. This bus was studied for a possibility to use Hydrogen as a fuel for public transportation in Penn State. PTI was able to get funding by the Pennsylvania Department of Environmental Protection and the Pennsylvania Department of Community and Economic Development to convert one of CATA's forty-foot New Flyer C40LF buses to run on a hydrogen/natural-gas blend (HCNG). The project was suspended as of 2009.

2012 Fleet Upgrades 
In the summer of 2012, CATA took a delivery of 28 brand new 40' New Flyer Xcelsior CNG-powered buses. Those buses replaced the 16 40' Orion V buses and also the 9 35' New Flyer C35LF LYNX buses (#38-45 and #47) from Orlando, FL. All of the Xcelsior buses are 40' despite the fact that nine replaced 35' buses. This replacement plan also allowed CATA to make a net gain of 3 40' buses in their fleet, as only 25 buses were replaced.

Fare-Free Routes 
In the fall of 1999, CATA and Penn State came up with an agreement in which CATA would take over all bus transportation on campus, which would be fare-free. Four routes were created as part of the agreement: The Blue and White Loop (in conjunction with the school's colors), and the Red and Green Link. All four routes run during the fall and spring semesters. Only Blue Loop and Red Link run on the summer and operate under a limited service schedule. No Loop or Link services on Sundays during summer except special events.

 Blue Loop – Clockwise route around the campus via College Avenue.
 White Loop – Counterclockwise around the campus via Beaver Avenue.
 Red Link – Runs from West Campus to Innovation Park via Curtin Road.
 Green Link – Runs simultaneously with the Red Link from the stadium parking lots to North Atherton, via Curtin Road. (Only in service on weekdays during Fall and Spring Semester.)

Major Service Routes 
CATA's service routes (also known as the "Centre Line") travel around the Penn State campus, downtown State College, and the surrounding areas. All routes run under full service during fall and spring semesters, and reduced service during the summer.

Gameday Football Shuttle 
During home Penn State football games, CATA also runs two special service routes which serve as the gameday football shuttle. The Downtown Shuttle runs on a loop through downtown State College en route to Beaver Stadium, with bus stops placed in front of a number of various hotels located along the route. The other route is the South Atherton Shuttle which also runs from a designated parking lot in the Hills Shopping Center to Beaver Stadium, allowing fans to park their cars and take the shuttle to the stadium.

Fare Information 
 $2.20 for each bus route (excluding the Blue Loop, White Loop, Red Link, Green Link).
 Senior citizens 65 and older: Free
 Individuals with disabilities: Half Fare ($1.10)

Fleet 
CATA operates 71 buses for its fixed routes. CATA also has 8 Paratransit mini-buses and 45 vans for vanpools.

Retired Fleet

CNG Buses 
In the summer of 2009, Orlando, FL's Central Florida's Regional Transportation Authority (LYNX) donated 10 35' New Flyer buses to CATA. These buses were donated because of CATA's extensive knowledge of CNG powered systems. These buses are most frequently seen on the lower capacity routes, although they occasionally appear on the N, V, R, and NV routes. These buses replaced the six Gillig Phantoms in CATA's fleet.

Future Enhancements

Bus Replacement Project 
In January 2008, CATA officially received $1.4 million in federal funding earmarks through the Transportation/HUD Appropriations bill for the 2008 fiscal year. With these funds, CATA will begin a fleet replacement project where 10 of the 16 Orion buses will be replaced with newer low-floor CNG-powered models. Following that, the remaining six buses will eventually be replaced with 4 articulated buses to accommodate the demand on the N, R, and V routes during rush-hour on weekdays as well as Penn State football games and other high-profile events.

References 

 https://catabus.com/about-cata/
 APTA Ridership Statistics
 https://web.archive.org/web/20080518004742/http://www.catabus.com/CATAlogApril2008.htm#Fall2008ServiceChanges

External links 
Centre Area Transportation Authority – official site.

Bus transportation in Pennsylvania
State College, Pennsylvania
Transit authorities with natural gas buses
Municipal authorities in Pennsylvania
Transportation in Centre County, Pennsylvania
Government of Centre County, Pennsylvania